Hiroyuki Takahashi may refer to:

, Japanese footballer
, Japanese video game producer and designer
, Japanese children's writer

References